A barangay captain, or a barangay chairman, is the highest elected official in a barangay, the smallest level of administrative divisions of the Philippines. Sitios and puroks are sub-divisions of barangays, but their leadership is not elected. As of March 2022, there are 42,046 barangays and therefore 42,046 barangay captains.

The current position was created in 1991 and is a successor to historical positions known variously as cabeza de barangay, barrio lieutenant, and barrio captain.

Along with the college of barangay kagawad (barangay councilors), captains comprise the sangguniang barangay or barangay council. They perform many official government duties, and execute minor judicial powers as part of the Barangay Justice System, such as settling disputes between neighbors. Viewed as village elders, they also work informally with a number of organizations.

Captains are elected for three-year terms. The most recent 2018 Philippine barangay and Sangguniang Kabataan elections were held on May 14, 2018.

History 

While the current structure dates only to the 1970s, the concept of a village leader has a long history, as it was already evident amongst pre-colonial barangays. During the Spanish era, the office was known by the title cabeza de barangay (literally, "head of the barangay"), and was an unelected post.

At the beginning of the American colonial period, the office was renamed barrio lieutenant. Under the Administrative Code of 1917, passed by the Philippine Assembly, these too were not elected but rather appointed by and under the supervision of the city councilor for the barrio. Councillors were elected at that time by electoral districts. Barrio lieutenants received no pay or other compensation. The lieutenant was to assist the city councilor and his term ended when the councilor's term ended.

During the American colonial period and after independence in 1946, barangays were known as barrios and barangay leaders were known as barrio lieutenants. In the U.S. the most similar political position to a barangay captain is a county executive (though the US counterpart covers more land and has more population on average than a Filipino barangay), the US colonial administration of the Philippines helped model the barangay captain's powers to that more of a US county executive.  

In 1991, the position took its present name and form with amendments to the Local Government Code.

Responsibilities 

The captain, along with the barangay councilors (barangay kagawad) comprise the sangguniang barangay or barangay council. Apart from performing many official government duties, they also execute minor judicial powers as part of the Barangay Justice System, such as settling disputes between neighbors. They also work informally with a number of organizations at the local level.

Republic Act No. 10755 authorized the punong barangay to administer the oath of office of any government official, including the president of the Philippines and the vice president of the Philippines.

Compensation 
Barangay officials receive a salary of between ₱600 and ₱1,000 a month as per the Local Government Code. They receive other forms of compensation as well.

See also 
 Ancient barangay
 Cabeza de barangay
 League of Barangays of the Philippines
 Poblacion
 List of cities and municipalities in the Philippines
 Pecalang and Hansip

References 

Barangays of the Philippines
Local politicians in the Philippines
Positions of subnational authority
Tagalog words and phrases